Valenzuela gynapterus is a species of Psocoptera from Caeciliusidae family that can be found in Finland, France, Germany, Latvia, Luxembourg, Norway, Poland, Romania, Spain, Sweden, Switzerland, and the Netherlands.

References

Caeciliusidae
Insects described in 1891
Psocoptera of Europe